Dicranucha is a genus of moths in the family Gelechiidae.

Species
 Dicranucha albicincta (Meyrick, 1921)
 Dicranucha crateropis (Meyrick, 1921)
 Dicranucha dicksoni Janse, 1963
 Dicranucha homochroma Janse, 1954
 Dicranucha legalis (Meyrick, 1921)
 Dicranucha nephelopis (Meyrick, 1921)
 Dicranucha ochrostoma (Meyrick, 1913)
 Dicranucha serialis (Meyrick, 1908)
 Dicranucha sterictis (Meyrick, 1908)
 Dicranucha strepsigramma (Meyrick, 1937)

References

 
Gelechiidae